Jessica Mink (formerly Douglas John Mink) is an American software developer and a data archivist at the Center for Astrophysics  Harvard & Smithsonian. She was part of the team that discovered the rings around the planet Uranus.

Early life and career 
Mink was born in Lincoln, Nebraska in 1951 and graduated from Dundee Community High School in 1969. She earned an S.B. degree (1973) and an S.M. degree (1974) in Planetary Science from the Massachusetts Institute of Technology (MIT). She worked at Cornell University from 1976 to 1979 as an astronomical software developer. It was during this time that she was part of the team that discovered the rings around Uranus. Within the team she was responsible for the data reduction software and the data analysis. After working at Cornell she moved back to MIT, where she did work that contributed to the discovery of the rings of Neptune. She has written a number of commonly used software packages for astrophysics, including WCSTools and RVSAO.

Despite not having a PhD, Mink is a member of the American Astronomical Society and the International Astronomical Union.

Personal life 
Mink is an avid bicycle user. She has served as an officer and director of the Massachusetts Bicycle Coalition and has been the route planner for the Massachusetts portion of the East Coast Greenway since 1991.

Mink is a transgender woman, and she publicly came out in 2011 at the age of 60. She has since spoken out about her experiences transitioning. She was also featured in two articles about the experiences of transitioning in a professional environment. She was a co-organiser of the 2015 Inclusive Astronomy conference at VanDerBilt University.

Mink currently lives in Massachusetts (USA), and has a daughter.

References

External links
 Jessica Mink's Homepage

1951 births
Living people
People from Lincoln, Nebraska
Harvard University staff
Massachusetts Institute of Technology alumni
Transgender women
LGBT people from Nebraska
American LGBT scientists
Transgender scientists
Planetary scientists
Women planetary scientists